Akka Mogudu (Telugu: అక్క మొగుడు) is an Indian Telugu language soap opera directed by Venkata koti Degala and written by Kommanapalli Ganapathi Rao aired on Gemini TV every Monday to Saturday at 6:30PM IST from 28 May 2018 to 2 October 2021 for 863 episodes. The serial stars Aishwarya Varma, Preethi Srinivas and Vasudeva Rao, Vandana Gollu, Kiran kanth as main protagonists and  Sowjanya, Kavya Gowda in pivotal roles.

Series overview

Plot

The story follows two twins Ramya and Sowmya who are poles apart in their personality and ideals. Things take a turn when Amar enters their lives. How these two sisters overcome turbulences in their lives shapes the rest of the story. The team states the title was selected on basis of the plot. The title was chosen as it is apt for the story of twin sisters and their marital lives.

Cast

Season 2
Aishwarya Gowda (533 - 564)/Preethi Srinivas (564 - 748) as Meghana
Vasudeva rao as Jai
Vandana Gollu as Chaitra (Ramya and Amar's daughter)
Sowjanya as Gurramkonda Devamma (Ramya's daughter)
Kiran Kanth as Charan, Chaitra's husband
Mallika as Oscar lakshmi
Kavya Gowda as Sowmya
Meka Ramakrishna as Raghuram, Chaitra's grandfather
Nalini Bandi as seethamma (chaitra's grandmother)
Sandhya Peddada as Santhamma (Jai's mother)
Swaroopa as Sumathi, Meghana's mother
Sudheer as Bhairava (Devamma's brother)
Kondama Raju as Basava (Devamma's brother)
Anil as Sanketh (Sowmya's Assistant)

Season 1
Aishwarya Gowda as Ramya
Kavya Gowda as Sowmya, after face surgery
Vasudeva Rao as Amar (Ramya's Husband)
Shyam Gopal as Sandeep (Ramya's best friend)
Saakshi Siva as Raghuram, Amar's father 
Aamani as Janani, Family court counsellor
Janaki Verma as Seethamma (Ramya and soumya's mother)
Sobha Rani as Rajeswari (Sandeep's mother)
Sindhuja as Dr. Madhulatha (Sandeep's wife)

Aabid Bhushan as Raj kumar

Veerababu as Bantu (Rajkumar's assistant)
Malladi Shivannarayana as Amar's Grand father
Mounika as Shailu
Jaya harika as Nisha

Former cast
Aishwarya Gowda as Sowmya, before face surgery (dual role)

Awards and nominations

References 

Indian television soap operas
Telugu-language television shows
2018 Indian television series debuts
Gemini TV original programming